Psephellus bellus is a species in the genus Psephellus, subtribe Centaureinae, found in Anatolia and Transcaucasia.
It is an evergreen plant, with gray-green to silvery imparipinnate leaves showing elliptic to ovate leaflets.
It is used in gardening because the creeping stems can root in contact to the ground, and the plant grows slowly into a dense cover.
The flowers are purplish pink and bloom from March to June.

References 

Cynareae
Plants described in 1866